The EG Awards of 2012 are the seventh Annual The Age EG (Entertainment Guide) Awards and took place at Billboards on 20 November 2012. The event was hosted by Myf Warhurst. It was the last time under the title of EG Awards before changing its name to Music Victoria Awards from 2013 onwards.  

Warhurst in a press release for the ceremony said "As a past writer for the EG and a Melbourne music fan for my entire adult life, there could be no greater pleasure than to help celebrate and congratulate what is one of the greatest music scenes in the world at an event put together by Melbourne's finest music/arts guide."

Performances
Van Walker
Liz Stringer
Angie Hart
Jess Cornelius from Teeth & Tongue
Mikelangelo
Emma Russack

Hall of Fame inductees
 Weddings, Parties, Anything

Weddings, Parties, Anything were inducted into the EG Hall of Fame as they celebrate the 25th anniversary of their 1987 debut, Scorn of the Women.

 Ian Rumbold (non-musician)

Award nominees and winners

All genre Awards
Winners indicated in boldface, with other nominees in plain.

References

2012 in Australian music
2012 music awards
Music Victoria Awards